"Cheated on Me" is a song written and performed by Gavin DeGraw from his self-titled album as the third single, released in September 2008.  The song was inspired by a failed relationship DeGraw had with a woman who was fed up with his jealousy.

Music video
The video of the song was released on September 30, 2008.

Critical reception
In an overall positive review, Chuck Taylor of Billboard states that while DeGraw's "strong vocal skills would be better showcased with less layering," he concluded "this killer track, should help separate him from the pack and boost name recognition to staple status."

Charts

References

2008 singles
Gavin DeGraw songs
Pop ballads
Rock ballads
Songs written by Gavin DeGraw
2008 songs
J Records singles